Jonathan Schneer (born August 9, 1948) is an American historian of modern Britain whose work ranges over labor, political, social, cultural, and diplomatic subjects. He is an emeritus professor at the Georgia Institute of Technology.
In addition to writing numerous scholarly and popular books, he has written for such publications as The Washington Post, The New York Times, The Wall Street Journal, and Foreign Policy.  His work has been translated into German, Chinese, and Turkish.  He has appeared often on American, Canadian, and British media.  He has lectured in six countries.

Early life and education 
Jonathan Schneer was born on August 9, 1948 in New York City.  His father, Richard Schneer (1919–2004), was a dentist with a practice in New York City, who retired to Berkshire County in northwestern Massachusetts, where he devoted himself to progressive causes.  His mother, Sophie Solomonoff Schneer (1920–2009), was a modern dancer in New York City, who became a choreographer and school teacher in Williamstown, Massachusetts.  He has one sister, Deborah Schneer, a photographer.

Schneer spent his first twelve years in New York City, where he attended the Little Red School House.  He attended Mt. Greylock Regional High School in Williamstown, Massachusetts, from which he graduated in 1966. He earned his B.A. with honors in history from McGill University in 1971, and his PhD from Columbia University in 1978, where Stephen Koss supervised his dissertation.

Career 
Schneer's first teaching post was at Boston College in 1976, initially as a teaching assistant for Peter Weiler, then as an Instructor. Yale University hired him as an Assistant Professor in 1979. He became a full professor at the Georgia Institute of Technology in 1989, where he taught until 2018. He was an early member of the editorial board of the Radical History Review and served as an editor for many years, including three as book review editor. His book, London 1900: The Imperial Metropolis, opened his eyes to the possibility of writing for a broad audience.  He has been trying to do that ever since, without sacrificing depth of scholarship.

Personal life 
In 1980, Schneer married Margaret Hayman, a lawyer.  Upon moving from New Haven to Atlanta, she took a position as staff attorney with the Atlanta Legal Aid Society, from which she retired in 2019.  They have two sons, Benjamin Hayman Schneer, an Assistant Professor of American Politics at the Harvard Kennedy School who is married to the journalist and writer Elizabeth Segran, and Seth Hayman Schneer, an attorney in Washington, D.C., who specializes in health law.  Schneer and his wife divide their time between Atlanta and Williamstown, Massachusetts.

Honors and awards 
Schneer has been a Whiting Fellow and a fellow of the American Council of Learned Societies.  More recently he has been a Beaufort Scholar at St. John’s College, Cambridge University, a Christensen Visiting Fellow at St. Catherine’s College, Oxford University, and the Helen Cam Visiting Scholar at Girton College, Cambridge.

New Statesman and The Irish Times both chose The Balfour Declaration as a book of the year. That book also won a 2010 National Jewish Book Award. The BBC History Magazine listed both The Balfour Declaration and Ministers of War as a book of the month.

Books

Co-edited books

References

External links 
 

Historians of the British Isles
1948 births
People from New York City
McGill University alumni
People from Williamstown, Massachusetts
Columbia University alumni
Yale University faculty
Georgia Tech faculty
Living people
Historians from New York (state)